Copister is a village in Yell. It is a former centre for haaf fishing, and has a shingle beach.

References

External links

Canmore - Yell, Copsiter, Nettlehaa site record

Villages in Yell, Shetland